Marquis Cornwallis was launched at Sunderland in 1802. She traded widely, to the West Indies, the Iberian peninsula, and the Baltic. The American privateer  captured her in 1814 but released her as a cartel to deliver a challenging mesage to the British government. She was wrecked in 1823.

Career
Marquis Cornwallis first appeared in Lloyd's Register (LR) in 1802. In 1803 LR showed her master as G.Killer, changing to T.Letsne and then to T. Simpson. Her owner was "Captain & Co.", and her trade London–Tobago, changing to London–Copenhagen.

On 17 January 1814, Marquis of Cornwallis, Simpson (late), master, put into Weymouth, in a leaky state. she had been sailing from London to Gibraltar.
 
Lloyd's List reported on 6 September on a number of prizes that had fallen prey to the American privateers Chasseur, David Porter, and Whig. Chasseur had captured Marquis Cornwallis, Simpson, master, on 8 August, but had given her up as a cartel. She had arrived off the Isles of Scilly on 30 August. Marquis Cornwallis had been sailing from Teneriffe to Portsmouth.

On 27 August 1814, Captain Thomas Boyle, of Chasseur, captured Marquis Cornwallis,  and by her sent a message to King George. Boyle issued a proclamation of blockade, forbidding “ships and vessels of all and every nation in amity and peace with the United States from entering... any of [their] said ports. 

In September 1818 Marquis Cornwall, Napier, master, was on her way from Dunkirk to Petersburg when she ran aground on the Swine Bottoms in the Baltic Sea, off Denmark. The "Diving company" assisted in getting her off and she arrived in the Sound on the 12th.

Fate
Marquis Cornwallis, Herring, master, foundered on 3 December 1823 off the Dogger Bank, in the North Sea. She was on a voyage from Sunderland, County Durham, to London with a cargo of coals. A light collier from Shields saved her crew.

Citations

References
 

1802 ships
Ships built on the River Wear
Age of Sail merchant ships of England
Captured ships
Maritime incidents in December 1823